Preeti Jhangiani is an Indian model and actress. Jhangiani first appeared in Rajshri Productions music album Yeh Hai Prem in 1997. She is known for her work in the Telugu films Thammudu (1999), Narasimha Naidu (2001), Malayalam film Mazhavillu (1999) and in her Hindi debut in the multi-starrer film Mohabbatein (2000) opposite Jimmy Shergill.

Biography 
Preeti Jhangiani was born into a Sindhi Hindu family.  She first appeared in a Rajshri Productions music album Yeh Hai Prem opposite Abbas. This made them—as well as the Koala symbol used in the album—famous. Thereafter, she appeared in Nima Sandal soap ads and also various other ads

Her first film was in Malayalam alongside Malayalam star Kunchacko Boban which was called Mazhavillu (1999). She then acted in two Telugu films, Thammudu (1999) opposite Pawan Kalyan and Narasimha Naidu (2001) opposite Balakrishna. She made her Bollywood debut in 2000 with Mohabbatein. Her next film was the comedy Awara Paagal Deewana (2002). She also acted in Punjabi films such as Sajna ve Sajna and Bikkar Bai Sentimental (2013).

Her latest release was the Rajasthani film Taawdo the Sunlight (2017) for which she won the Best Actress award at the Rajasthan International Film Festival (RIFF), and won special jury award for best actress in Rajasthan Film Festival 2017, Film was successful at boxoffice, Recently she appeared in The Pushkar Lodge.

Her latest release was the Bengali Movie Mistake directed by S.K Bangalore in the year 2013 and it was based on mistakes of our society which effect the student career. Good written script and Direction was superb. It was released globally.

Preeti stated in 2012 that she'd be making a comeback in the film industry after matrimony and motherhood.

Personal life

She is the daughter of Gobind Jhangiani and Menka Jhangiani. She completed her schooling from G D Somani Memorial School, Mumbai and partially attended Jai Hind College, Mumbai but never graduated.  She married actor Parvin Dabas on 23 March 2008 and had her first child, a son Jaiveer, on 11 April 2011. She gave birth to her second child Dev on 27 September 2016. She lives in Bandra, Mumbai, with her family.

Music videos

Filmography

See also

 List of Indian film actresses

References

External links
 

Living people
Actresses from Mumbai
Female models from Mumbai
Indian film actresses
Sindhi people
Actresses in Hindi cinema
Actresses in Bengali cinema
Actresses in Tamil cinema
Actresses in Malayalam cinema
Actresses in Kannada cinema
Actresses in Punjabi cinema
Actresses in Telugu cinema
Actresses in Urdu cinema
Hindi film producers
Film producers from Mumbai
Indian women film producers
Businesswomen from Maharashtra
Jai Hind College alumni
Indian expatriate actresses in Pakistan
International Indian Film Academy Awards winners
20th-century Indian actresses
21st-century Indian actresses
Year of birth missing (living people)